Abdeladim Khadrouf (born 3 January 1985) is a Moroccan footballer who plays for MAS Fez.

International career

International goals
Scores and results list Morocco's goal tally first.

References

External links 
 
 

1985 births
Living people
Moroccan footballers
Morocco international footballers
Association football midfielders
Moghreb Tétouan players
Wydad AC players
Raja CA players
Chabab Rif Al Hoceima players
Maghreb de Fès players
Botola players
2016 African Nations Championship players
Morocco A' international footballers